Gorgoroth is a Norwegian black metal band founded by Infernus.

Studio albums

Live albums

Demos and promos

Other appearances

References

External links
 Official website

Discographies of Norwegian artists
Heavy metal group discographies
Discography